The 2020 North Carolina FC season is the 14th season for North Carolina FC and its second in the USL Championship, the second-tier professional soccer league in the United States.

The season was suspended March 12 after the opening week because of the COVID-19 pandemic. It restarted July 11 with a restructured format and schedule, with NCFC's first game scheduled for July 17.

The team partnered with rapper J. Cole's Dreamville Festival for kit sponsorship for the season.

Roster

Competitions 
Source:

Friendlies

USL Championship

Standings — Group G

Match results
All games broadcast on ESPN+ as part of the USL Championship's rights agreement with the platform. Home games broadcast locally on WRAL-2.

U.S. Open Cup 

As a USL Championship club, North Carolina FC was scheduled to enter the competition in the second round, which was to be played April 7–9. Pairings for that round were announced on January 29. The first three rounds of the tournament were postponed on March 13, 2020, amid the COVID-19 pandemic. On August 17, the tournament was canceled.

Squad statistics
Source: Match reports

Appearances and goals

|-
|}

Goal scorers

Disciplinary record

References

North Carolina FC seasons
North Carolina FC
North Carolina FC
North Carolina FC